The Yuma Expedition was a U.S. Army military operation from 8 February 1852, to October, 1852 in the Yuma War.

First Establishment of Camp Yuma 

Following the failure of the California Militia against the Quechan people (Yuma Indians), in the Gila Expedition, the U. S. Army sent the Yuma Expedition under Captain Samuel P. Heintzelman, to establish a post at Yuma Crossing of the Colorado River in the vicinity where it met the Gila River in the Lower Colorado River Valley region of California. He was to protect travelers on the overland route from the east to California and to quell any hostilities by the Quechan people (Yuma Indians).

After reconnoitering his route, Heintzelman marched out of San Diego on 3 October 1850 with three companies of the 2nd Infantry Regiment with another infantry company establishing a depot at Vallecitos. He then sent a small party in advance digging wells in the desert between Vallecitos and the Colorado River. He reached Vallecitos 3 November and the Yuma Crossing on 27 November, a third company arriving a few days later. Camp Yuma was established with the tents protected from sun and wind by brush and reed fences and arbors. A garden and vineyard were started near the river. The Quechan living in the vicinity of the camp were quiet and friendly.

Supply difficulties began when supply wagons arrived late and did not carry enough to supply the troops for long. Supply by sea from San Diego had been requested but did nor arrive as planned. When it did arrive boats had difficulty bringing it up from the mouth of the Colorado against the rivers difficult current and course. Bringing it overland by waggon was difficult also but more successful.

Heintzelman requested a steamboat be sent to carry supplies up river but supplies ran dangerously low. Additionally the crops of the local Quechan had failed and were asking for food from the camp and Heintzelman was ordered in June 1851 to evacuate the camp leaving only a small detachment of ten men under Lieutenant Sweeny to guard the ferry.

Garra Revolt and the beginning of the Yuma War
Some of the leaders of the Quechan were opposed to the occupation of their homeland along the Colorado River in the (Yuha Desert) and Arizona (Yuma Desert).

Campaign of the Yuma Expedition

Notes and references

See also
 John Joel Glanton
 Gila Expedition
 Fort Yuma
 Indian Wars

Yuma War
Quechan
1852 in California
Yuma
Lower Colorado River Valley
History of Imperial County, California
History of Yuma County, Arizona
Native American history of Arizona
Native American history of California
Yuma, Arizona